The First All-Union Turkological Congress is the first Turkological Congress, held from 26 February to 5 March 1926 in Baku, the capital of the Azerbaijan SSR.

In August 1925, the Council of Peoples Commissars of the SSR decided to convene the All-Union Turkological Congress. For the first time, the question of the congress was raised and submitted to the government of the USSR by Azerbaijan a year earlier. The issue of allowing the writing in the Latin alphabet was raised at the 1st Azerbaijan Local History Congress, six months before the decision was made to convene the Turkological Congress by the USSR Government, by the Academy of Sciences of the USSR, and by the All-Union Association of Oriental Studies.

With the decision of the Council of Peoples Commissars of the USSR, an Organizing Commission was formed to prepare the convocation of the congress. It included: S. Aghamalioglu (chairman), M. Pavlovich, H. Jabiyev, V. Bartold, A. Samoilovich, J. Korkmasov, G. Broydo, N. Tyuryakulov, Arthur Siefeldt-Simumägi, A. Fitrat, B. Choban-zade, N. Ashmarin, A. Odabash, Z. Navshirvanov, A. Baitursynov, A. Yusif-zade.

The organizing commission was publishing "VESTNIK" on the pages of which announced about all the work carried out with regards to the preparation of the All-Union Turkological Congress. Central and regional scientists, as well as those from abroad, took part in the work of the congress. There were 111 people representing the scientific and public organizations of the Turkic-speaking republics and regions of the Soviet Union, and 20 representatives of the scientific world. Vasily Bartold, Ilya Borozdin, Bekir Chobanzade, Mehmet Fuat Kopruluzade, Nicholas Poppe, Alexander Samoylovich, Sergei Oldenburg, Lev Shcherba and others held presentations. The resolution of the congress was presented by its co-chairman J. Korkmasov.

The First All-Union Turkic Congress played an important role in the history of the Turkic studies development in the Soviet Union.  

Already in 1928, the curtailment of the indigenisation policy was outlined, and at the end of the 1930s, during the Great Terror, many congress participants were accused of pan-Turkism, nationalism, counterrevolutionary activities, they were repressed, and died. Among them were Alexander Samoilovich, Dzhelal Korkmasov, Bekir Chobanzade, Osman Aqçoqraqlı, Akhmet Baitursynov, Salman Mumtaz, Ruhulla Akhundov, Isidor Barakhov, Hanafi Zeynalli, Hikmet Dzhevdet-zade and many others.

On 28 April 1976, there was held the Second Republican Conference of the Young Philologists on the topic "The current Issues of Turkmen Philology" at the Academy of Sciences of the Turkmen SSR Institute of Language and Literature named after Makhtumkuli. It was dedicated to the 50th anniversary of the First Turkological Congress.

See also 
 Turkology
 Pan-Turkism

References

1926 in Azerbaijan
Turkology
Academic conferences